McGeoch is a surname. Notable people with the surname include:

Alex McGeoch (1854–1922), Scottish footballer
Catherine McGeoch, American computer scientist
Charles McGeoch (1899–1985), American football coach
Ian McGeoch (1914–2007), British Royal Navy officer
John McGeoch (1955–2004), Scottish guitarist
John Alexander McGeoch (1897–1942), American psychologist and educator
Lillian McGeoch (1903–1992), Canadian painter and sculptor